William E. Wise (March 15, 1861 – May 5, 1940) was an American professional baseball player. He played in Major League Baseball for three seasons from 1882 to 1886, splitting his time between pitcher and the outfield. He played for the Baltimore Orioles of the American Association, the Washington Nationals of the Union Association, and the Washington Nationals of the National League.  Wise died in his hometown of Washington, D.C. at the age of 79, and is interred at Glenwood Cemetery.

References

External links

Baseball players from Washington, D.C.
Major League Baseball pitchers
Major League Baseball outfielders
Baltimore Orioles (AA) players
Washington Nationals (UA) players
Washington Nationals (1886–1889) players
Nationals of Washington players
Washington Nationals (minor league) players
Albany (minor league baseball) players
Harrisburg (minor league baseball) players
1861 births
1940 deaths
19th-century baseball players